Ioviță is a Romanian surname. Notable people with the surname include:

 Adrian Iovita (born 1954), Romanian-Canadian mathematician
 Valentin Ioviță (born 1984), Romanian footballer
 Vlad Ioviță (1935–1983), film director, writer, and publicist

Romanian-language surnames